The 2020 Vancouver Whitecaps FC season is the club's tenth season in Major League Soccer, the top division of soccer in the United States and Canada. Including previous iterations of the franchise, this is 43rd season of professional soccer being played in Vancouver under a variation of the "Whitecaps" name.

Around September and towards the end of the season, COVID-19 cross-border restrictions imposed by the Canadian government forced the Whitecaps to play the remaining home matches at Providence Park in Portland, Oregon.

On November 16, 2019, the Whitecaps named Axel Schuster as the club's new sporting director.

Roster

Transfers

In

Transferred in

Loans In

Out

Transferred out

Loans Out

Major League Soccer

Preseason

Regular season

League tables

Western Conference

Overall

Results

Matches

MLS is Back Tournament

As part of MLS's restart plan from the COVID-19 pandemic. The three group stage games will count towards the regular season standings. The winner of the tournament will qualify for the 2021 CONCACAF Champions League.

Group stage

Knockout stage

Canadian Championship

Qualification

As part of the MLS regular season, Canada's three Major League Soccer clubs will play each other three times from August 18 to September 16. The team with the most points from this series will qualify for the Canadian Championship.

Statistics

Appearances and goals

|-
! colspan="14" style=background:#dcdcdc; text-align:center| Goalkeepers 

 

 

|-
! colspan="14" style=background:#dcdcdc; text-align:center| Defenders
 

        
                                  
 
                                         

       
|-
! colspan="14" style=background:#dcdcdc; text-align:center| Midfielders
 
 

 
     
                                 
   
                            
|-
! colspan="14" style=background:#dcdcdc; text-align:center| Forwards 

 

|-
! colspan="14" style=background:#dcdcdc; text-align:center| Players transferred out during the season

Goalscorers

Clean sheets

Disciplinary record

Notes

References

Vancouver Whitecaps
Vancouver Whitecaps
Vancouver Whitecaps
Vancouver Whitecaps FC seasons